Hangzhou Botanical Garden is a large public botanical garden located in Hangzhou City, Zhejiang Province, People's Republic of China.

Introduction
The garden was founded in 1956. It is located in Taoyuanling, Xihu District, Hangzhou. The soil belongs to the red soil and yellow soil, with pH value ranging from 4.9 to 6.5. It is affiliated to Hangzhou Gardens and Relics Management Bureau. It's also a main botanical study and research base for Zhejiang University.

External links
 Hangzhou Botanical Garden 

Parks in Zhejiang
Botanical gardens in China
Tourist attractions in Hangzhou